Sehmi is an Indian (Ramgarhia) surname and may refer to:
Gursaran Singh Sehmi (1931–2009), Kenyan field hockey player
 Mandip Sehmi (born 1980), British wheelchair rugby player
 Sarabjit Singh Sehmi (born 1963), Kenyan field hockey player
 Satiender Sehmi (born 1954), Kenyan sports shooter
 Ranjit Singh Sehmi (born 1949), Kenyan field hockey player

See also 
Sehmilan

Surnames
Indian surnames
Surnames of Indian origin
Punjabi-language surnames
Ramgarhia clans